Consumed may refer to:


Books
 Consumed (book), a 2013 book by Harry Wallop
 Consumed (novel), a 2014 debut novel by David Cronenberg

Film and television
 Consumed (film), a 2015 American film
 "Consumed" (Haven), a television series episode of Haven
 "Consumed" (Law & Order: Criminal Intent), a television series episode
 "Consumed" (The Walking Dead), an episode of the television series The Walking Dead
 Consumed (TV series), a reality television series on HGTV Canada

Music
 Consumed (band), an English punk rock band
 Consumed (GOD album), 1993
 Consumed (Plastikman album), 1998

See also 
 Consumer, a user of goods and services
 Consumption (disambiguation)